Nancy Schwartzman is an award-winning documentary filmmaker and a member of the Directors Guild of America.  

Nominated for the U.S. Documentary Grand Jury Prize at Sundance Film Festival and the F:ACT Award at CPH: Dox, her newest film, Victim/Suspect follows Investigative journalist Rae de Leon as she travels nationwide to uncover and examine a shocking pattern: Young women tell the police they’ve been sexually assaulted, but instead of finding justice, they’re charged with the crime of making a false report, arrested, and even imprisoned by the system they believed would protect them. It is a Netflix Original documentary with the Center for Investigative Reporting and Motto Pictures. The film will premiere on Netflix to 190 countries on May 23, 2023.

She is the creator and director of a 6-part original series for Freeform/Disney with XTR Studios, currently in production.

Her debut feature documentary Roll Red Roll (PBS/BBC/Netflix) was nominated for a Peabody award, and exposed the notorious Steubenville, Ohio high school sexual assault case and uncovered the social-media fueled "boys will be boys" culture that let it happen. Roll Red Roll garnered 7 best documentary awards, premiered in 2018 at the Tribeca Film Festival and Hot Docs, and has screened at over 40 film festivals worldwide. The film opened theatrically with 100% on Rotten Tomatoes. It was a Critic's Pick in The New York Times and reviewed in The New Yorker, Variety, The Hollywood Reporter, the Chicago Tribune and the Los Angeles Times amongst others. 

She is the author of a recent non-fiction book Roll Red Roll: Rape, Power and Football in the American Heartland released in July 2022 with Hachette and received stellar reviews from the New York Times, Publisher’s Weekly, Kirkus and Library Journal. This is a deep dive into the Steubenville, Ohio case and a follow-up from the award-winning film.

Her short films including One Shot One Kill, for Mother Jones (2020) and Anonymous Comes To Town (2019), co-produced with the Tribeca Film Institute and Gucci's Chime for Change, have garnered over 5 million views.

For her human rights filmmaking and technology development to prevent sexual violence, she is the winner of awards from the Obama/Biden White House, the United Nations and the Avon Foundation. She is a tech founder and created the Circle of 6 safety app.

She is represented by UTA, a graduate of Columbia University and newly based in Los Angeles.

Personal life
Schwartzman was raised in Bryn Mawr, Pennsylvania. She attended Harriton High School and the Shipley School and graduated from Columbia University in New York City in 1997.

Films

Before becoming a documentary filmmaker, Schwartzman worked as a production assistant for Killer Films and received credit for Todd Solondz's Happiness and Todd Haynes' Velvet Goldmine. Schwartzman also worked on the social media advertising campaigns for the documentary films The Invisible War and Girl Model.

The Line (2009)

Schwartzman "explores the issue of consent, the burden of blame and the trouble society has defining the two" in her first film, The Line. The short documentary was used by a White House campaign and its impact campaign was supported by partnerships with Men Can Stop Rape, Hollaback, Planned Parenthood NYC, The Pixel Project, National Sexual Violence Resource Center, and AEquitas.

The film was completed in July 2009 and has been used subsequently for educational institutions and private homes to help combat and explore rape culture. It has also been screened at multiple festivals, American and international most notably International Women's Film Festival, Israel, Muslim Women and Sexuality Conference, Turkey, Istanbul, Sex:: Tech Conference, San Francisco, and Men's Gender Equity and Anti-Violence conference.

The film was marketed with the Line Campaign, including a group blog – whereisyourline.org, now defunct – which encouraged discussion about issues related to sexual violence. The blog was maintained by female students.

xoxosms (2011)

Schwartzman's second documentary, xoxosms, followed the life and loves of two modern young people, and explored the digital intimacy that comes with new social networking technology, seeing it less as harm than something that fosters open communication. xoxosms was produced by Cinereach and premiered on PBS POV in July 2013. It was also featured on the BBC Radio 4 Digital Human series.

Roll Red Roll (2018) 
Roll Red Roll, Schwartzman's first feature-length documentary, examined the cultural factors at play behind the notorious Steubenville, Ohio high school rape case.  It premiered in 2018 at the Tribeca Film Festival and Hot Docs. Roll Red Roll won seven documentary feature awards and was nominated for the Cinema Eye Honors Spotlight Award. It is now streaming on Netflix.

Roll Red Roll‘s impact campaign was supported by the Fledgling Fund, Bertha Foundation, Perspective and the Ford Foundation.

"Steubenville is just like your town or school," Schwartzman wrote in her director's statement for PBS. "Watching and studying the police interviews, the story shows clearly that rapists and bystanders are not “monsters”, they are us—our sons our fathers, our coaches, our friends. When we turn them into 'monsters'—it makes rape hard to “see” and eradicate. We as individuals and communities have to take responsibility and teach accountability to our children so that they understand this is wrong. And that speaking up and intervening is the right thing to do, even if no one else is doing it. I am hopeful that audiences take these lessons to heart and will move forward in creating safe, loving and caring communities for our future generations."

"Anonymous Comes to Town" (2019) 
Schwartzman also released a companion short film to Roll Red Roll, "Anonymous Comes To Town," co-produced with the Tribeca Film Institute and Gucci's Chime for Change, with the Guardian.

Angeline (2019) 
Schwartzman directed the short documentary Angeline, which tells the story of a woman who found out, at the age of 30, that she had been lied to about her genetic identity after taking a 23andMe DNA test. The company released the documentary in 2019.

"One Shot One Kill" (2020) 
“One Shot One Kill” is an immersive verite documentary that follows a father and his two sons as they embark on their annual deer hunting trip in rural Tennessee. This family tradition connects the Neal family to the beauty of the land, the tradition of hunting, and what it means to be both a hunter and gun owner in the United States today.

"Victim/Suspect" (2023) 
Nancy Schwartzman directed the documentary "Victim/Suspect," which follows Rae de Leon, a reporter working at The Center for Investigative Reporting, who discovers a surprising number of legal cases nationwide that involve women reporting sexual assault to the police, only to be accused of fabricating their allegations. "Victim/Suspect" follows de Leon as she gathers firsthand accounts from numerous young women and their families and interviews police and legal experts. Simultaneously, de Leon re-examines elements of the initial police investigations, unearthing telling recordings of police interviews of women reporting their sexual assault.

Schwartzman crafts a deeply compelling and provocative investigative documentary, sure to elicit both empathy and outrage, that stands as a powerful testament to the carefully constructed work of determined reporters like de Leon. "Victim/Suspect" illuminates, with precision and focus, how local and nationwide systemic policing policies both motivate detectives to treat victims like suspects, and directly impact not only these vulnerable women’s cases, but also their lives.

Tech + Media 
In response to a spike in street violence in NYC, Schwartzman founded NYC – Safestreets.org. The initiative was noted in the New York Times, New York Daily News, Village Voice, and others. Schwartzman was also a founding editor and Creative Director of the print edition of Heeb magazine.

Circle of 6 App 
In 2011, Schwartzman created the app "Circle of 6," which now has over 350,000 users in 36 countries. The free anti-violence app won the 2011 White House Apps Against Abuse Contest, with Vice President Joe Biden calling it "a new line of defense against violence" for young people.

References

External links

Press coverage for The Line

American filmmakers
Living people
People from Bryn Mawr, Pennsylvania
Columbia College (New York) alumni
People from New York City
American women chief executives
Year of birth missing (living people)
Harriton High School alumni
Shipley School alumni
21st-century American women